Ceratoxancus lorenzi is a species of sea snail, a marine gastropod mollusk in the family Costellariidae.

Distribution
This marine species occurs off the Philippines.

Original description
 Poppe G.T., Tagaro S.P. & Sarino J.C. (2012) A new Ceratoxancus (Gastropoda: Ptychatractidae), from the Philippines. Visaya 3(5): 29-32. [March 2012].

References

External links
 Worms Link

Costellariidae